CJRY-FM is an FM Christian radio station that broadcasts on 105.9 FM from Edmonton, Alberta. The station uses the on-air brand Shine FM often with the tag-line "Safe and Fun for the Whole Family!", referencing the core goal of the station, and mainly plays contemporary Christian music.

CJRY received approval by the CRTC in 2003 and first aired in September 2004. Owned by Touch Canada Broadcasting (2006) Inc., CJRY currently has four sister stations: AM 930 CJCA in Edmonton, CJSI-FM and AM 700 CJLI in Calgary, and CKRD-FM in Red Deer.

References

External links
Shine 105.9 FM
 

Jry
Jry
Radio stations established in 2004
2004 establishments in Alberta